Cristian Brandi (born 10 June 1970 in Brindisi, Italy) is a former professional tennis player from Italy.

Brandi enjoyed most of his tennis success while playing doubles. During his career, he won two doubles titles and finished as a runner-up nine times. He achieved a career-high doubles ranking of World No. 50 in 2000.

Brandi participated in three Davis Cup ties for Italy from 1994 to 1995, posting a 2–1 record in doubles.

Career finals

Doubles (2 wins, 9 losses)

References

External links
 
 
 

Italian male tennis players
People from Brindisi
Living people
1970 births
Tennis players at the 2000 Summer Olympics
Olympic tennis players of Italy
Sportspeople from the Province of Brindisi